Tyne Metropolitan College is a college of further education in North Tyneside, England.

About Tyne Metropolitan College
Tyne Metropolitan College is a General Further Education College located in the borough of North Tyneside (one of five metropolitan districts that make up the Tyne and Wear conurbation) and predominantly serves the borough of North Tyneside and the wider hinterland including the Newcastle City Region, Northumberland and South Tyneside.  The College is a major employer in the borough with around 300 employees.

History and Campus Locations

Tyne Metropolitan College, Coast Road Campus, Wallsend
TyneMet was established in March 2005 as a result of the amalgamation between Tynemouth Sixth Form College and North Tyneside Further Education College.  TyneMet operates from three principal sites; the Coast Road Campus, which predominantly provides a vocational based curriculum with a number of higher education pathways, the Queen Alexandra Campus, located in North Shields, which offers A Level provision and a range of arts based qualifications at The Creative Studios (see further information below under Queen Alexandra Campus), and TMC in Benton, which focuses on training for the construction and building industries with a range of employment-focused vocational training programmes at levels 1, 2 and 3 (see further information below under TMC Benton).  
The address for the Coast Road Campus is: Battle Hill Drive, Wallsend, Tyne & Wear NE28 9NL.

Queen Alexandra Campus, North Shields
The Queen Alexandra (QA) Sixth Form College is a school–college collaboration dedicated to A Level teaching.  The key partners are John Spence Community High School, Marden High School, Norham High School and Tyne Metropolitan College. Queen Alexandra offers a wide range of AS and A2 courses in a Sixth Form College giving you the independence to learn in a fully supported environment. The QA Campus is located at Hawkeys Lane, North Shields, Tyne & Wear NE29 9BZ.

TMC, Benton
A new division of the College is announced for 2013 onwards, TMC in Benton, specialising in training for the construction industry. TMC specialises in vocational training for the construction and building trades, and has a huge choice of career-based courses to supply students with the skills employers are looking for in the workplace. TMC is located at : Units 40-41, North Tyne Industrial Estate, Whitley Road, Newcastle upon Tyne NE12 9SZ.

Courses
Courses offered provide vocational training. Subjects include Art & Design, Beauty Therapy, Business & Retail, Catering, Computing, Counselling, Employability, Maths and English, Engineering, Floristry, Foundation Learning, Hairdressing & Barbering, Health & Social Care, English for Speakers of Other Languages, Pharmacy, Prince's Trust Programme, Sport, Teaching, Travel & Tourism, Uniformed Services, Working with Children & Young People.

The range of full- and part-time courses extends from Entry Level through Levels 1, 2 and 3 to Higher Education programmes.

Target learners
TyneMet College caters for a wide range of age groups from those aged 14 years (alongside their GCSE studies), up to adults of any age. The main groups of students at the College are:
 16- to 18-year-old school leavers continuing their education post-GCSE
 Adults aged 19 years and over studying on part-time courses for career advancement or for fun
 Adults aged 19 years and over studying on Higher Education (HE) programmes, such as HNCs, HNDs, Foundation Degreesa dn Teaching qualifications, in preparation for degrees.
 Employees undertaking work-based learning on tailored programmes devised between the College and their employer, or on Apprenticeship training programmes.

Catchment
The college covers a geographical area from the river Tyne in the south to Bedlington in the north and bordered by the outskirts of Newcastle upon Tyne to the west. A number of students travel from more distant parts of the region, such  as Teesside, to access specialist provision such as the North East Sports Academy, and the College draws increasing numbers of learners from south Northumberland.

North East Sports Academy (NESA)
Students can enroll as a North East Sports Academy (NESA) student no matter which subject they are studying at Tynemet, QA or TMC. Being a member of NESA means they receive free coaching in a chosen sport: men's and women's football, rugby (union and league), men's and women's basketball, badminton or Mixed Martial Arts (MMA).

Notable former pupils
Andrew Dunn - stage, film and television actor,
Paul Harvey British musician and Stuckist artist
John Heppell former Labour Party politician

References

HM Government data 2011-12 places TyneMet College as the top provider for 16-18s on Level 3 long courses across all of Tyneside.
HM Government data 2011-12 places TyneMet College as the top provider for adults aged 19 years+ on long courses across all of Tyne & Wear and Northumberland.

External links
 Tyne Met
 Queen Alexandra Sixth Form College
 TMC in Benton
 

2005 establishments in England
Education in the Metropolitan Borough of North Tyneside
Educational institutions established in 2005
Further education colleges in Tyne and Wear
Sixth form colleges in Tyne and Wear
Wallsend